The Census of Sri Lanka is a census held by the Sri Lankan Department of Census and Statistics, traditionally taking place every 10 years. The first census of Sri Lanka was taken in 1871, making it the first country in South Asia to conduct a census. The most recent census took place in 2012, the first complete census in the country since 1981 due to disruptions from the Sri Lankan Civil War.

History
The first census in Sri Lanka was held on 27 March 1871 and conducted by the Registrar General's Office, making it the first of any country in South Asia. It was conducted from then on every ten years.

The Census Department was created on 1 December 1944 for taking the Census of 1946, which was postponed from 1941 due to World War II. The Soulbury Constitution of 1947 combined the Census Department with the Statistics Department to create the Department of Census and Statistics.

The 1951 census was postponed to 1953 due to a shortage of paper. The following census was held in 1963, before reverting back to traditionally holding the census on the first year of the decade for the censuses of 1971 and 1981.

The 1991 census was not held due to the Sri Lankan Civil War (1983–2009), with areas in the Northern and Eastern Provinces controlled by the Tamil militant LTTE. The subsequent 2001 census covered 94% of the country, with no coverage in the Jaffna, Kilinochchi, and Mullaitivu Districts, and only partial coverage in the Vavuniya, Mannar, Batticaloa, and Trincomalee Districts. The following census was held in 2012.

References

External links

Sri Lanka census